Brachiacantha quadripunctata is a species of lady beetle in the family Coccinellidae. It is found in North America.

Subspecies
These two subspecies belong to the species Brachiacantha quadripunctata:
 Brachiacantha quadripunctata flavifrons Mulsant, 1850
 Brachiacantha quadripunctata quadripunctata (Melsheimer, 1847)

References

Further reading

 

Coccinellidae
Articles created by Qbugbot
Beetles described in 1847